Pascale Isho Warda was the Minister of Immigration and Refugees in the Iraqi Interim Government.

Career 
An Assyrian Christian, Warda was born in 1961 in the city of Nohadra. She later was exiled to France, where she attended the University of Lyon and received her Master's degree in human rights studies.

In 2004-2005, Warda served as Minister of Immigration and Refugees in the Iraqi Interim Government that replaced the rule of the Coalition Provisional Authority following the U.S. invasion of 2003. As minister, Warda voiced support for the execution of former Iraqi dictator Saddam Hussein. During her time as minister, she was invited by the First Lady of the United States, Laura Bush, for a discussion on global women's issues at the G8 Summit in Sea Island, Georgia.

In 2005, Warda and her husband, journalist William Warda, led in the founding of the Hammurabi Human Rights Organization, a non-profit group that monitors and opposes human rights violations against members of Iraq's minority groups. Since 2015, she and her husband have worked with the Alliance of Iraqi Minorities, a coalition of civil society groups working to forge better cooperation among Iraq's disparate, and often divided, minority communities--including Christians, Shabaks, Mandaeans, Yarsanis (Kaka'is), Baha'is, Faili Kurds and Yazidis. Pascale Warda also has served as President of the Assyrian Women's Union in Baghdad.

In 2019, the U.S. State Department awarded Pascale and William Warda one of its inaugural International Religious Freedom Awards.

Personal life
Pascale and William Warda have two daughters, Shlama and Neshma.

Sources
 Center for Foreign Relations

References

External links
 
 Pascal Warda at a AWU meeting

Iraqi Assyrian people
Chaldean Catholics
University of Lyon alumni
Iraqi emigrants to France
1961 births
Living people
Iraqi Eastern Catholics
People from Duhok
21st-century Iraqi women politicians
21st-century Iraqi politicians
French people of Iraqi descent
French people of Assyrian descent